The Westin Chennai Velachery is a 10-storied five-star hotel in Chennai, India. Located on Velachery Main Road in Velachery, a southern suburb of Chennai, it is the sixth Westin hotel in India.

History
The hotel was opened in February 2013. In November 2013, the hotel launched its Asian speciality restaurant, EEST (standing for Elegant, Exquisite, Serenity and Triumph).

The hotel
The hotel is built on a plot measuring 7792 sq m. The hotel has four food and beverage venues, including an all-day dining, a specialty restaurant, a bar and a poolside restaurant. Leisure facilities in the hotel include a gym named Westin Workout, an outdoor pool, a spa named 'Heavenly Spa', and a group running programme called 'Run Westin'. It also features over 12,600 square feet (1,170 sq m) of meeting and function space, including two pillarless ballrooms and 12 break-out rooms, in addition to a business centre. The hotel features an open swimming pool on the second-floor terrace level.

The hotel has three restaurants, namely, the all-day dining Seasonal Tastes, Pan Asia EEST and the Poolside Grill and Barbeque, in addition to the cricket-themed lounge bar Willows. There is a Westin Executive Club located on the top floor of the hotel.

The central courtyard of the hotel has a 35-feet cascading water body.

See also

 Hotels in Chennai
 List of tallest buildings in Chennai

References

External links
 

Hotels in Chennai
Westin hotels
Skyscraper hotels in Chennai
Hotels established in 2013
Hotel buildings completed in 2013